Shizuoka Broadcasting System, Inc.  (SBS, 静岡放送株式会社) is a Japanese broadcaster in Shizuoka. Its radio station is affiliated with Japan Radio Network (JRN) and National Radio Network (NRN), and its TV station is affiliated with JNN (Japan News Network).

Broadcasting

Radio 
SBS Radio
 Shizuoka 1404 kHz JOVR; 93.9 MHz FM
 Hamamatsu 1404 kHz; 94.7 MHz FM
 Mishima 1404 kHz; 90.1 MHz FM

Digital TV (ID:6) 
JOVR-DTV - SBS Digital Television
 Shizuoka – channel 15
 Hamamatsu – channel 21

Analog TV 
JOVR-TV - SBS Television (analog ended July 24, 2011)
 Shizuoka – channel 11
 Hamamatsu – channel 6

Supplement 
 Shizuoka Broadcasting System has no connection with the South Korean network SBS.
 Although SBS radio doubled the output of a key station in 10 kW at 1990 October 1, the stereophonic broadcast is not started yet.

History 
The abbreviation, SBS, has been used since September 22, 1960.

Programs

Radio 
 Smile for You (:ja:ほのぼのワイド 中村こずえのsmile for You) –　hosted by Kozue Nakamura　(中村こずえ, former Tokyo FM announcer) 
 Gogo wide Raburaji (:ja:GOGOワイドらぶらじ) – hosted by Mikihito Tetsuzaki (鉄崎幹人), Tetsu Sugihara (杉原徹), Yasuharu Katsuyama (勝山康晴)
 G1 (ended)
 Monday Soccer Stadium (ended)

Television 
 SBS TV Evening paper (ended)
 Sole!Iine (from Monday to Wednesday 9:55-11:00, Thursday and Friday 9:55-11:00 )
Eve Ai Shizuoka (4:45-7:00 [JST])

Item 
 Shizuoka Shimbun (Shizuoka's local newspaper)

External links 
 SBS website
 Shizushin SBS Group website

Japan News Network
Television stations in Japan
Radio stations established in 1952
Television channels and stations established in 1958
Mass media in Shizuoka (city)
1958 establishments in Japan